Antonaves (Vivaro-Alpine: Antonavas) is a former commune of the Hautes-Alpes department in southeastern France. On 1 January 2016, it was merged into the new commune Val Buëch-Méouge. It is located at the confluence of the rivers Méouge and Buëch, and is known as the gateway to the Gorges de la Méouge, a 4 km limestone gorge.

Population

See also
Communes of the Hautes-Alpes department

References

Former communes of Hautes-Alpes
Populated places disestablished in 2016
Dauphiné